Hou Rongsheng is the pinyin transliteration of . It may refer to:

 Hau Yung Sang, Republic of China and Republic of China (Taiwan) international footballer, but born in Hong Kong
 Hou Zong-Sheng (1926–1990) writer in Chinese language, born in the mainland China with Taiwan and United States citizenship